Cockroad Wood Castle was a castle near Wincanton but now in the parish of Charlton Musgrove, Somerset, England.

History

Cockroad Wood Castle was a motte and bailey castle, probably built after the Norman conquest of England in 1066. The castle sits close to the contemporary Norman castles of Ballands and Castle Orchard, and may have been built a system of fortifications to control the surrounding area. By 1086 the surrounding land was held by Walter of Douai, although no documentary evidence of the castle remains.

The castle was built with a motte and two baileys, running along a north–south ridge, with a possible entrance to the east. The motte today is 13.5m wide, up to 7.5m high and is surrounded by a 1.25m deep ditch. The two baileys were probably linked to the motte by wooden bridges.

Today the castle site is a scheduled monument.

See also
Castles in Great Britain and Ireland
List of castles in England

Bibliography
Creighton, Oliver Hamilton. (2005) Castles and Landscapes: Power, Community and Fortification in Medieval England. London: Equinox. .

References

Castles in Somerset
Former castles in England
Scheduled monuments in South Somerset